Germencik is a town and a district of Aydın Province in the Aegean region of Turkey.

Geography 
Germencik is located in the middle of the fertile Büyük Menderes (Meander) plain, inland from the Aegean coastal town of Kuşadası, on the Aydın-İzmir highway  from the city of Aydın. It is also the junction of the İzmir-Aydın-Afyonkarahisar and Ortaklar-Söke railway lines.

Until the 1950s the plain was a swampy area subject to regular flooding and Germencik grew as people moved from the wet lands into the town. Today Germencik itself is a small town of 12,000 people, astride the Izmir-Aydın highway, providing high schools, a hospital, a library and other services for the surrounding district. There are more health centres and primary schools in the villages of the district.

The economy of Germencik depends on agriculture, the main crops are figs and olives but cotton, sesame and other crops are also grown here. Of the 374.39 km2 total area of Germencik 255.8 km2 is planted and of the remainder 106.23 km2 is forest, 6.65 km2 is  meadow/pasture, 5.19 km2 is unused and 0.52 km2 is lake or swamp. In 1998 16,950 tons of cotton were produced from 56.5 km2, 7,500 tons of figs from 87.22 km2 and 44,170 tons of olives from 92.92 km2. Sheep and cattle are raised too and there is a small dairy industry as well as bee-keeping and some poultry farming.

Industry in the area is mainly the processing of the local produce to make tahini, halva, olive oil etc.

The people live the traditional Turkish rural lifestyle with strong family ties etc. The women generally have their heads covered and wear long skirts.

Places of interest 
 The remains of the antique city of Magnesia on the Maeander are located on the west side of Route D525 between Ortaklar and Söke, just west of the village of Tekin, in Aydın Province at 37°51'N 27°31'E.

See Magnesia on the Maeander for more details of this city, founded by Ancient Greeks from Thessaly and in its day a key trading partner of Priene, Ephesus, Tralles and other major Aegean cities. The ruins have been excavated and include a theatre, temples and an Ancient Roman gymnasium, and baths. Magnesia was commercially and strategically at an important location in the triangle of Prien, Ephesus and Tralles.

The first excavations at the archaeological site were made in 1891 by Carl Humann of the Berlin Museum. 21 Month long excavations revealed (partially or fully) the theatre, Artemis temple, agora, Zeus temple and prytaneion. Excavations resumed at the site, after almost 100 years, in 1984, by Prof. Dr. Orhan Bingöl on assignment from Ankara Üniversitesi and Turkish Ministry of Culture. Findings at the archaeological site are now displayed at museums of Istanbul, as well as Berlin and Paris, where they were illegally smuggled.

The most important and the biggest piece smuggled outside Turkey is the whole façade of the Zeus temple (smuggled by the German archeological team), which is currently in possession of the Berlin Bergama Museum. The Turkish government has made several unsuccessful attempts to date, to return it.

 The hot springs in the villages of Alangüllü, Çamur, and Gümüşlü, all 10–12 km north of Germencik.

See also 
75th Anniversary Selatin Tunnel, Turkey's second longest road tunnel on the motorway .

References 

Populated places in Aydın Province
Cities in Turkey
Archaeological sites in the Aegean Region
Districts of Aydın Province
Germencik District